Budišov is a market town in Třebíč District in the Vysočina Region of the Czech Republic. It has about 1,200 inhabitants.

Administrative parts
The village of Mihoukovice is an administrative part of Budišov.

References

Populated places in Třebíč District
Market towns in the Czech Republic